Jacob Nolde (1859–1916) was an American industrialist and environmentalist who was largely responsible for the creation of Nolde Forest Environmental Education Center, a Pennsylvania state park in Berks County, Pennsylvania in the United States.

Nolde was a German immigrant who came to the United States in 1880. He was born in 1859 in Berleburg, Westphalia, Germany. Nolde may have been descended from a family of foresters, but this fact is unclear. It is thought that his grandfather was a forester who cared for one of the many "beautifully manicured princely forests" of 18th and 19th century Germany. Nolde may have been inspired by the forests of his native land when he began the project of creating a coniferous forest on his property in Cumru Township just south of Reading.

Hosiery baron
Nolde arrived on a steamship in 1880 in Philadelphia, Pennsylvania. He was drawn to the German speaking communities of southeastern Pennsylvania and quickly found employment as a weaver for the Louis Kraemer Woolen Mills near Reading. Nolde soon rose to the top of the corporate ladder at Kraemer Mills, from there he was able to acquire much of the machinery that Kraemer Mills had used in their hosiery business. Nolde established his own hosiery factory in Reading in 1888, just eight years after leaving Germany. Nolde took on some partners, Jacob Lorah and George Horst, and was able to expand his hosiery business. His operation, Nolde and Horst Company, employed 500 workers who operated about 400 knitting machines in 1897.

The factory was devastated by a fire in 1899, but Nolde and Horst were soon back in business after rebuilding the factory. Nolde had situated himself to become one of the leading citizens of Reading.

Leading citizen and environmentalist
Nolde was married twice. He married women who also happened to be the sisters of his partners, Jacob Lorah and George Horst. He married his first wife, Lydia Lorah, in 1889. Together they had two children, Ella and Carl, but Lydia died shortly after the birth of Carl. Nolde then married Anna Louise Horst in 1893, and she bore four children: George, Carol, Hans, and Louise. The family lived in a large home on the slopes of Mount Penn, near his factories in Reading. Nolde then set out to better the life of his family by creating a forest near their new home, "Sheerlund", which he built south of Reading in Cumru Township.

When Nolde purchased the land, a single white pine was growing there. Inspired by this single tree, Nolde set out to create a "luxury forest" to be a source of family pride and pleasure. The massive white pine is now surrounded by a forest of Douglas fir and Norway spruce trees that were planted under Nolde and later, the supervision of Austrian born forester William Kohout.

Nolde dreamt that his forest would resemble the coniferous forests of his native Westphalia. He bought about 500 acres (2 km²) of future timberland in Cumru Township in 1904 and continued to acquire the land that would become Nolde Forest Environmental Education Center until his death in 1916. This land had been either farmland that had lain fallow for a number of years, or scrubby deciduous forest just beginning to recover from being stripped to make charcoal by colliers for the nearby iron furnaces. Nearly 500,000 coniferous trees were planted by 1910, but then Nolde realized that his dream of a small forest had surpassed all his expectations and saw the need to properly manage the forest.

Nolde hired William Kohout as head forester, and Kohout hired a contractor to build roads and trails to the forest to help prevent and fight forest fires. Kohout was a master forester from Austria, who had attended forestry schools in Bohemia and Saxony and received a degree from the University of Vienna. Kohout came to America in the 1880s or 1890s and first worked as an engineer for a mining company before getting back into forestry.  Kohout then worked on a private estate as a forester near Wilkes-Barre, where he first came into contact with Jacob Nolde. Together they started the forest that became Nolde Forest Environmental Education Center in 1970.

However, the Nolde Forest Environmental Education Center is not the only lasting mark that Jacob Nolde left before his unexpected death in 1916. The following quotes are excerpts from his obituary.

Nolde also donated $15,000 to Mercersburg Academy in Mercersburg, Pennsylvania to build a gymnasium there to honor his son Carl, who had died while he was a student at the academy. This gym is still being used today by the students at Mercersburg.

Although Nolde gained tremendous wealth, there is evidence that he never lost touch with his working-class roots. Visitors to his factories were often surprised to find him working alongside his employees and he put much personal effort into creating his forest himself, taking on the responsibility of personally planting trees and helping with the upkeep of the forest.

Nolde Forest Environmental Education Center
Nolde Forest was acquired by the Commonwealth of Pennsylvania in the late 1960s. The Environmental Education Center was established by the Berks County Intermediate Unit with the help of grants from the United States Government in 1970. Nolde Forest Environmental Education Center was the first such center to be owned and operated by the Pennsylvania Department of Conservation and Natural Resources.

Jacob Nolde was a pioneering environmentalist whose work lives on today at Nolde Forest Environmental Education Center. The main purpose of Nolde Forest Environmental Education Center is to provide environmental education for the citizens of southeastern Pennsylvania and specifically the students of the nearby elementary schools, high schools, colleges, and universities. Nolde Forest stays busy offering hands on opportunities to these students and their teachers with a "discovery and problem solving" approach. These are lessons that Nolde sought to pass onto his children and succeeding generations of Pennsylvanians.

References

American environmentalists
German emigrants to the United States
People from Reading, Pennsylvania
1859 births
1916 deaths